The City of Newcastle is a local government area in the Hunter region of New South Wales, Australia. The City of Newcastle incorporates much of the area of the Newcastle metropolitan area.

The Lord Mayor of City of Newcastle Council is Councillor Nuatali Nelmes, a Labor politician. Nelmes was elected at a by-election on 15 November 2014 following the resignation of Jeff McCloy, the former Lord Mayor. The Awabakal and Worimi peoples are acknowledged by Council as the traditional custodians of the land and waters of Newcastle.

History
Following the passing of the Municipalities Act 1858 by the New South Wales parliament, the Municipality of Newcastle was proclaimed on 7 June 1859. The new Municipality was divided into three wards - City, Macquarie, and Honeysuckle.  Eight years later, the Municipalities Act 1867 classified the Newcastle Municipality as a "Borough".

The Greater Newcastle Act 1937 merged the City of Newcastle with 10 of its suburban municipalities to form the City of Greater Newcastle. The Act also transferred parts of the Lake Macquarie Shire and Tarro Shire to the new city. The amalgamations and transfers took effect from 2 April 1938.

The newly created City of Greater Newcastle was subsequently renamed to City of Newcastle on 23 March 1949.

Proposed amalgamation
After a 2015 review by the NSW Government Independent Pricing and Regulatory Tribunal found that Newcastle City Council was not "fit for the future", it was recommended that the City of Newcastle merge with Lake Macquarie City Council. The outcome of an independent review was completed by mid–2016. On 14 February 2017, the NSW Government announced it would not be proceeding with further regional council mergers, including the Newcastle City Council and Port Stephens Council merger.

Demographics
At the 2016 census, there were  people in the City of Newcastle local government area, of these 49.3 per cent were male and 50.7 per cent were female. Aboriginal and Torres Strait Islander people made up 3.5 per cent of the population, which was higher than the national and state averages of 2.9 and 2.9 per cent. The median age of people in the City of Newcastle was 37 years, just below the national median of 38. Children aged 0 – 14 years made up 16.9 per cent of the population and people aged 65 years and over made up 16 per cent of the population. Of people in the area aged 15 years and over, 40.7 per cent were married and 15.4 per cent were either divorced or separated.

Population growth in the City of Newcastle between the 2001 census and the 2006 census was 3.91 per cent; and in the subsequent ten years to the 2016 census, population growth was 9.64 per cent. When compared with total population growth of Australia for the same periods, being 5.78 per cent and 17.86 per cent respectively, population growth in the City of Newcastle local government area was significantly lower than the national average. The median weekly income for residents within the City of Newcastle was marginally lower than the national average.

At the 2016 census, over 80% of residents in the City of Newcastle local government area stated their country of birth as Australia significantly exceeding the national average of 66.7%. Almost 60% of all residents in the City of Newcastle nominated a religion with Catholicism being at almost 25%, which was slightly higher than the national average of 22.6%. As at the 2016 census, households in the City of Newcastle local government area had a significantly lower than average proportion (11.6%) where a language other than English is spoken (national average was 22.2%).

Council

Current composition and election method
Newcastle City Council is composed of thirteen Councillors, including the Lord Mayor, generally for a fixed four-year term of office. The Lord Mayor is directly elected while the twelve other Councillors are elected proportionally as four separate wards, each electing three Councillors. The most recent election was held in September 2021.  The Lord Mayor elected at that time, Jeff McCloy, resigned in 2014, and a by-election for Lord Mayor was held on 15 November 2014.  The current makeup of the council, including the Lord Mayor, is as follows:

The current Council, elected in September 2021, in order of election by ward is:

Sister cities

Newcastle Council has sister city relations with the following cities:

References

Notes